The 1926 Colorado gubernatorial election was held on November 2, 1926. Democratic nominee Billy Adams defeated Republican nominee Oliver Henry Shoup with 59.84% of the vote.

Primary elections
Primary elections were held on September 14, 1926.

Democratic primary

Candidates
Billy Adams, State Senator
Samuel W. Johnson

Results

Republican primary

Candidates
Oliver Henry Shoup, former Governor
John F. Vivian
Carl S. Milliken, Secretary of State of Colorado

Results

General election

Candidates
Major party candidates
Billy Adams, Democratic
Oliver Henry Shoup, Republican

Other candidates
Frank Cass, Farmer–Labor 
Edward F. Wright, Socialist
William R. Dietrich, Workers
Barney Haughey, Independent

Results

References

1926
Colorado
Gubernatorial